Jason Barry (born 14 December 1972) is an Irish actor best known for his portrayal of Tommy Ryan in the 1997 film Titanic. He also starred in The Still Life for which he won numerous awards.

Early life
Jason Barry was born in Artane, Dublin, Ireland. He has two brothers, Keith and Glen.

Career
Barry is a graduate of The Samuel Beckett Center for performing arts at Trinity College, Dublin. His first lead role was in a BBC Film called Screen Two: O Mary This London (1994).

In 1997, he played Tommy Ryan in the film Titanic.

Jason had a recurring role as Dano, a member of the Continuity IRA in the 3rd and 4th Seasons of the Irish crime series Love/Hate.

In 2014, Jason played the role Edgar Willcox in 'United Passions, a film detailing the history of FIFA. Its release is set to coincide with beginning of the 2014 World Cup in Brazil.

In 2016, he performed voice over and motion capture work as Corporal Sean Brooks in Call of Duty: Infinite Warfare,  a first-person shooter video game developed by Infinity Ward and published by Activision.

Personal life
Jason Barry married actress Kristin Alayna in 2012. He has two daughters: Freya Barry, born in 2005, and Nova Barry, born in 2007. Barry is a Manchester United fan. He is a keen marathon runner.

Filmography

Video games
 Call of Duty: Infinite Warfare (2016) - Corporal Sean Brooks
 Call of Duty: Modern Warfare (2019) - Additional Voices
 Call of Duty: Modern Warfare II (2022) - Additional Voices

References

External links

1972 births
Irish male film actors
Irish male television actors
Living people
Male actors from Dublin (city)
Irish male video game actors
20th-century Irish male actors
21st-century Irish male actors
People from Artane, Dublin
People educated at St Aidan's C.B.S.
Alumni of Trinity College Dublin